Quebec wine is wine made in the province of Quebec. The grape varieties grown in Quebec, both white and red, all have common qualities needed by the harshness of the winter season, including resistance to winter temperatures, resistance to spring freezes and being early ripening. Some 40 varieties are grown in Quebec, with the most commonly planted being Maréchal Foch, Frontenac, De Chaunac, Vidal and Seyval blanc.

Quebec wine makers have developed a large array of products including dry, semi-dry and fortified wines (including Vin doux naturel styles). Additionally the region produces ice wines, late harvest wines, sparkling wines and fruit wines.

Quebec counts six regions where vines are cultivated. They are the Eastern Townships, Montérégie, Québec, Basses Laurentides, Lanaudière, and Centre-du-Québec.

History
When French explorer Jacques Cartier sailed the St. Lawrence River, he noted the presence of wild grapes (Vitis riparia) on Île d'Orléans and for this reason named it Île de Bacchus, in honour of the Roman God of wine and drunkenness. In 1608, when Samuel de Champlain settled the site where Quebec City would later flourish, he planted French vines (Vitis vinifera) and discovered that they did not resist the winter very well. Small productions were nonetheless tried here and there over the years and in the 18th century, the inhabitants of the French colony were in the habit of making wine out of the wild grapes and other fruits. While the production remained small, the import of wine bottles from France was quite important (775,166 bottles in 1739 for an above-15 population of only 24 260 persons).

Following the conquest of French Canada by the British army in 1760, imports of French wine depleted quickly, as Great Britain's colonial policy favoured trade within the British Empire. Spirits (whisky, gin, rum, etc.) thus became the dominant type of alcohol being consumed by Quebecers and remained so until the late 19th century when trade relations between Canada and France were revived as a result of the British adoption of laissez faire.

In 1864, the Quebec government tried to encourage wine production in the province through subsidies. Wild grapes were again tried as well as hybrid varieties from the United States. The emerging industry went through important difficulties, not the least of which was the temperance movement trying to reduce the consumption of alcohol altogether and by the 1920s succeeding at prohibiting alcohol in the United States and all provinces of Canada. Despite the will of Quebecers, who voted at 81.1% against prohibition in the September 29, 1898 Canadian-wide referendum on the subject, the Parliament of Quebec enacted a law of total prohibition, which became effective on May 1, 1919. Shortly after, a Quebec-wide referendum was held in which Quebecers voted the exclusion of beer, wine, and cider from the prohibition list. Quebec remained the sole region of North America to escape total prohibition.

20th century to modern day
In 1921, an Alcoholic Beverages Act was passed and the Commission des liqueurs du Québec was established to conduct the trade of beer, wine and cider, and eventually spirits too. This state-owned corporation would then on exercise a legal monopoly on all distribution of alcohol in Quebec, which it still enjoys today (though the corporation now bears the name of Société des alcools du Québec).

With the diversification of Quebecers' alcohol consumption habits ultimately came a demand for local products. In the 1970s, some farmers began experimenting with hybrid varieties, both white and red. Early successes at developing quality products, prompted many others to follow and the 1980s and 1990s saw the burgeoning of numerous vineyards all over southern Quebec.

In 1987, the first few Quebec wine growers formed an association. The successes of some of its members ultimately caught the attention of the French and in 1995, the Association des Vignerons du Québec and the Syndicat viticole des Graves et Graves supérieures of the Bordeaux region united in a professional partnership.

Climate and geography
The St. Lawrence river valley, south of the province, is a fertile region where wild grapes and other fruits grow naturally and abundantly. However, the four-month-long winter of this humid continental climate zone freezes the land deep enough that most varieties of European vines do not survive. In the 1980s, Quebec wine growers started planting varieties known for their resistance to below-zero temperatures and in certain cases made use of modern techniques to heat up the soil during the coldest days of winter. Quebec wine makers have 6 months to accomplish what in warmer wine regions takes 11 to 12 months to do.

Grape varieties
The vine varieties that seem to grow the best in Quebec are those of the Northern France, Germany, and North-Eastern United States. Some 40 varieties are grown in Quebec, with the most commonly planted being, for red wine, Sainte-Croix, Maréchal Foch, Frontenac, Sabrevois and De Chaunac, and for white wine, Vidal, Seyval blanc, L'Acadie blanc, Vandal-Cliche and Geisenheim. In 2008, vines used in red wine made up 60% of the total planted area.

See also
 Beer in Quebec
 Quebec cider
 British Columbia wine
 Ontario wine
 Nova Scotia wine
 Cuisine of Quebec

References

Further reading
In French
 Aloir-Roy, Andrée-Nathalie (2004). Rendement du Seyval blanc dans un vignoble du Québec suite à l'essai de protections hivernales de neige artificielle, de neige naturelle et de feuilles, Sherbrooke: Département de géographie et télédétection (U de S), 143 p.
 SAQ (2002). Terroirs d'ici, Montréal: Société des alcools du Québec, 203 p.
 Aloir-Roy, Andrée-Nathalie et al. (2001). Variabilité des sols et stratégie d'échantillonnage dans les vignobles : cas du vignoble Sous les charmilles à Rock Forest, Québec, Sherbrooke: Département de géographie et télédétection (U de S), 85 p.
 Le Cours, Rudy (1998). À la découverte des vins et des boissons artisanales du Québec : vins, cidres, hydromels, boissons de petits fruits et de sève d'érable, Montréal: Éditions de l'Homme, 187 p.
 Dubois, Jean-Marie and Laurent Deshaies (1997). Guide des vignobles du Québec : sur la route des vins , Sainte-Foy: PUL IG, 297 p.
 Béraud, Huguette and Thierry Debeur (1995). La route des vignobles du Québec, Brossard: T. Debeur, 96 p.

External links
 Web site of the Quebec Winegrowers Association (QWA)
 "SAQ at a glance 80 Years... With Pleasure!", in the site of the Société des alcools du Québec

Wine regions of Canada
Economy of Quebec
Cuisine of Quebec
Culture of Quebec
Alcohol in Quebec